The POrtable COmponents (POCO) C++ Libraries are computer software, a set of class libraries for developing computer network-centric, portable applications in the programming language C++. The libraries cover functions such as threads, thread synchronizing, file system access, streams, shared libraries and class loading, Internet sockets, and network communications protocols (HTTP, FTP, SMTP, etc.), and include an HTTP server, and an XML parser with SAX2 and DOM interfaces and SQL database access. The modular and efficient design and implementation makes the libraries well suited for embedded system development.

The libraries are free and open-source software distributed under the Boost Software License 1.0.

Overview 
POCO is a set of C++ libraries providing users with library support similar to that found in other development environments, like the Java Class Library, .NET Framework, or Apple's Cocoa.  POCO is centered on network-centric application domains and developed with modern ANSI/ISO Standard C++ and C++ Standard Library facilities and techniques with emphasis on powerful functionality, ease of use, and consistency.  Governed primarily by code quality, consistent style and unit testing, POCO is highly portable, and already ported to a variety of different platforms.

History

Library hierarchy 

, POCO C++ Libraries are split into five core libraries with optional add-on libraries available with each release.  The design and hierarchy of POCO C++ is considered well designed. The five core component libraries cover the following areas that can be found in the basic edition:
Foundation
 Platform abstraction – Eases porting issues of fundamental types, etc.
 Memory management – Resource Acquisition Is Initialization (RAII), auto_ptr, reference counting garbage collection, etc.
 String utilities
 Error handling – Extended exception classes
 streams – Encoding and decoding and filtering support
 threads – Concurrent processing support
 Date and time – Date and time support including formatting and high precision timers
 File system – Abstracted file system support
 Logging – Application and system logging, filtering and logging strategies
 Processes – Interprocess communication and memory sharing
 shared libraries – Dynamic library support
 Notifications – Abstracted notification support
 Events – Abstracted event support and strategies
 Crypt – Random number generation, Digests and encoding/decoding engines
 Text – Unicode encoding support
 Regular expressions – Based on Perl compatible regular expression
 URI – Universal Resource Identifier support
 UUID – Universally Unique Identifiers support and generators
 Cache support – Abstracted strategy support
Net
 sockets – Abstracted low level network support
 Reactor pattern – Popular network abstraction pattern support
 MIME messages – Encoding support
 HTTP – High level HTTP support for client and servers
 FTP – High level FTP support
 Mail – POP3, SMTP stream based support
 HTML – Form support
XML
 SAX2
 Document Object Model (DOM)
 XML writer
JSON
 APIs for reading and writing JSON
Util
 Configuration files
 Command line options
 Tools and server application framework

One design goal of many targeted decisions are based around POCO C++ providing an easy to use component library that works out of the box.  , the libraries are available in two package formats: the basic and the complete editions.  The complete edition covers NetSSL, Crypto, Zip, and Data abilities, among others. The basic edition does not, and thus eliminates dependence on external facilities such as OpenSSL, ODBC, and MySQL dependencies.

Being open source enables and encourages development of further library functions.  Design and development of existing and upcoming library support is driven by the pragmatic needs of the user base.  Library additions occur in a sandbox development environment and are reviewed and integrated into the main library releases as approved by the core development team with input from contributors.

Release history
  2004 – Günter Obiltschnig began POCO by developing the class libraries because of being dissatisfied by what was available in C++ class libraries for network centric programming.
  February 21, 2005 – The first public release on SourceForge, under the Sleepycat License, contained the Foundation and XML support libraries.
  May 2005 – Aleksandar Fabijanic made the first contribution.
  January 19, 2006 – POCO 1.0 was released, including the Net library.
  July 2006 – POCO was relicensed under the Boost license.
  May 2007 – POCO 1.3 was released, including the Data library
  December 2010 – POCO 1.4 was released, including many improvements.
  December 2014 – POCO 1.6 was released, including the JSON and MongoDB libraries and many other improvements.
 March 2016 – POCO 1.7 was released, including many improvements.
 March 2018 - POCO 1.9 was released, including support for internationalized Domain Names and additions to supported text encodings.

Users 
Users include:
 Appcelerator Titanium
 Schneider Electric Buildings (formerly TAC)
 CACE Technologies
 Mantid
 Medical Imaging Interaction Toolkit
 OpenFrameworks
 GLUEscript
 SeguriData
 Aysso Systems
 Tonido
 Gladinet
 US Army's Communications Realism Appliance (CRA)

See also
 Adaptive Communication Environment (ACE)
 Boost (C++ libraries), a large set of C++ libraries
 Loki (C++)
 List of C++ template libraries
 List of C++ multi-threading libraries

Notes

External links
 
 
 POCO Changelog covering time lines

C++ libraries
Software using the Boost license
Web server software